Fuminori (written: 文紀, 文則, 史学, 史規 or 史法) is a masculine Japanese given name. Notable people with the name include:

, Japanese voice actor
, Japanese writer
, Japanese bobsledder
, Japanese comedian
, Japanese baseball player

Japanese masculine given names